Nactus cheverti, also known commonly as Chevert's gecko, the Fitzroy Island gecko, and the southern Cape York nactus, is a species of lizard in the family Gekkonidae. The species is endemic to Queensland in Australia.

Etymology
The specific name, cheverti, refers to the ship Chevert which William John Macleay used on his 1875 expedition to New Guinea.

Habitat
The preferred natural habitat of N. cheverti is forest.

Reproduction
N. cheverti is oviparous.

References

Further reading
Boulenger GA (1885). Catalogue of the Lizards in the British Museum (Natural History). Second Edition. Volume I. Geckonidæ .... London: Trustees of the British Museum (Natural History). (Taylor and Francis, printers). xii + 436 pp. + Plates I–XXXII. (Gymnodactylus cheverti, new name, pp. 41–42).
Cogger HG (2014). Reptiles and Amphibians of Australia, Seventh Edition. Clayton, Victoria, Australia: CSIRO Publishing. xxx + 1,033 pp. .
Wilson S, Swan G (2013). A Complete Guide to Reptiles of Australia, Fourth Edition. Sydney: New Holland Publishers. 522 pp. .
Zug GR (1998). "Australian populations of the Nactus pelagicus complex (Reptilia: Gekkonidae)". Memoirs of the Queensland Museum 42 (2): 613–626. (Nactus cheverti, new combination).

Nactus
Geckos of Australia
Reptiles described in 1885